Latimer is an occupation surname, meaning “interpreter” (literally “one knowing Latin”). Notable people with the surname include:

Academics and literature
 Elizabeth Wormeley Latimer (1822–1904), American writer
 Jon Latimer (1964–2009), Welsh historian and writer
 Wendell Mitchell Latimer (1893–1955), American chemist
 William Latimer (priest) (1467–1545), English clergyman and scholar of Ancient Greek

Arts and entertainment
 Andrew Latimer (born 1949), English rock musician 
 Chloe Latimer (born 1996), Scottish singer and songwriter 
 Hugh Latimer (actor) (1913–2006), English actor
 Ivy Latimer (born 1994), Australian actor
 Jason Latimer (born 1981), American magician
 Jonathan Latimer (1906–1983), American crime writer
 Louise Latimer (actress) (1913–1973), American actress
 Mark Latimer, English pianist from England
 Michael Latimer (1941–2011), British actor
 Michelle Latimer, Canadian actress
 Thom Latimer (born 1986), English professional wrestler and actor

Military
 Dennis Latimer (1895–1976), British World War I flying ace
 Joseph W. Latimer (1834–1863), Confederate officer from Virginia
 Kelly Latimer, former US Air Force lieutenant colonel and pilot and Virgin Galactic pilot

Politics and government
 Albert H. Latimer (c. 1800–1877), an Associate Justice of the Texas Supreme Court
 Asbury Latimer (1851–1908), farmer and U.S. Senator from South Carolina 
 George Latimer (Minnesota politician) (born 1935), mayor of St. Paul, Minnesota
 George Latimer (New York politician) (born 1953), New York State Senator and current Westchester County Executive
 George Latimer (Pennsylvania politician) (1750–1825), Speaker of the Pennsylvania House of Representatives
 George W. Latimer (1900–1990), an Associate Justice of the Utah Supreme Court
 Graham Latimer (1926–2016), New Zealand Maori leader
 Henry Latimer (judge) (1938–2005), lawyer and judge from Florida
 Henry Latimer (politician) (1752–1819), physician and U.S. Senator from Delaware
 Hugh Latimer (c. 1485–1555), bishop and Protestant martyr from England
 Matt Latimer, lawyer in various positions during George W. Bush's presidency
 Rebecca Latimer Felton (1835–1930), teacher and U.S. Senator from Georgia
 Thomas E. Latimer (1879–1937), American lawyer
 W. Irving Latimer (1836–1922), Michigan politician
 William Latimer (Australian politician), (1858–1935), Australian politician
 William Latimer, 4th Baron Latimer (1330–1381), English noble, soldier and diplomat

Sports
 Al Latimer (born 1957), American football player
 Cody Latimer (born 1992), American football player
 Don Latimer (born 1955), National Football League player
 Louise Latimer (tennis) (born 1978), British tennis player
 Tacks Latimer (1875–1936), American baseball catcher
 Tanerau Latimer (born 1986), New Zealand rugby union footballer
 Zach Latimer (born 1983), National Football League player

Other
 Allie B. Latimer (born 1928), American lawyer and civil rights activist
 Catherine Allen Latimer (1896–1948), African-American librarian
 George Latimer (escaped slave) (1819–c. 1896), escaped slave whose case became a major political issue in Massachusetts
 Hugh Latimer (c. 1485–1555), English bishop and Protestant martyr
 Lewis Howard Latimer (1848–1928), African-American inventor
 Robert Latimer (born 1953), Canadian farmer and murderer

Fictional characters
 Rick Latimer, in the American soap opera Love of Life
Harold Latimer, in the Sherlock Holmes short story "The Greek Interpreter"

See also
 Latymer (surname), a surname
 Latimore, a surname

Occupational surnames
English-language occupational surnames